Mérignies is a commune in the Nord department of the Hauts-de-France region of northern France. The village is situated around 19 kilometres outside of the city of Lille and in 2019 had a recorded population of 3,199.

Heraldry

Twinning
 Kilmacolm, Scotland, United Kingdom (Since 2014, concluding with visits by delegations from both settlements)

See also
Communes of the Nord department

References

Communes of Nord (French department)
French Flanders